José Jacinto Hidalgo (4 January 1943 – 22 May 2020) was a Venezuelan sprinter. He competed in the men's 400 metres at the 1968 Summer Olympics.

References

External links
 

1943 births
2020 deaths
Athletes (track and field) at the 1968 Summer Olympics
Athletes (track and field) at the 1971 Pan American Games
Athletes (track and field) at the 1972 Summer Olympics
Venezuelan male sprinters
Venezuelan male hurdlers
Olympic athletes of Venezuela
Pan American Games competitors for Venezuela
20th-century Venezuelan people
21st-century Venezuelan people
Pan American Games medalists in athletics (track and field)
Medalists at the 1971 Pan American Games
Pan American Games bronze medalists for Venezuela